Howz-e Hasan Ali (also Romanized as Ḩowz̤-e Ḩasan ʿAlī) is a village in Khusf Rural District, Central District, Khusf County, South Khorasan Province, Iran. At the 2006 census, its population was 7, in 5 families.

References 

Populated places in Khusf County